Ash Shabaziyah, Iraq is a village of Basrah Governorate in southern Iraq located on the west bank of the Shatt Al-Arab River between the Shatt al Arab and Hamma marshes.
The town has a primary school and at least 3 mosques.
The area is close to the  Mesopotamian Marshes(Hammar Marshes), and has traditionally been home to many Marsh Arabs.

The topography if flat with an elevation of 6 meters above sea level., and the climate is arid.

The area suffered greatly during the Iran–Iraq War, during which it was a major battlefield, and again after the 1991 Iraqi uprising.

References

Populated places in Basra Province